I Have Electric Dreams
() is a 2022 Spanish-language coming-of-age, drama film directed by Valentina Maurel, starring Reinaldo Amien Gutiérrez, Daniela Marín Navarro, Vivian Rodriguez and Adriana Castro García. The film produced by Gregoire Debailly and Benoit Roland is a co-production of Costa Rica, Belgium and France. It revolves around a young girl Eva, who lives with her mother, her little sister and their cat. The film captures the thin line between love and hate, in a world where aggression and rage intertwined with the vertigo of female sexual awakening. It premiered at the 75th Locarno Film Festival on 8 August 2022, where it won the Pardo for Best Direction, Pardo for Best Actress and Pardo for Best Actor.

Cast
 Reinaldo Amien Gutiérrez as Martín
 Daniela Marín Navarro as Eva
 Vivian Rodriguez as Anca
 Adriana Castro García as Sol
 Sarah Lefèvre
 José Pablo Segreda Johanning

Release
It premiered at the 75th Locarno Film Festival on 8 August 2022, where it won the Pardo for Best Direction, Pardo for Best Actress and Pardo for Best Actor. In September 2022, It made to 'Latin Horizons (Horizontes Latinos)' section of 70th San Sebastián International Film Festival, where it won Horizontes Award. It also made it to 'World Cinema' section of 27th Busan International Film Festival and was screened on 6 October 2022. In November 2022, it was featured in 'International Competition' section of 53rd International Film Festival of India, where it won Golden Peacock for Best Film and Best Actress Award. In December it was invited to the 28th Kolkata International Film Festival and was screened on 17 December 2022.

Reception 
Guy Lodge of Variety wrote "an auspicious debut feature from Costa Rican writer-director Valentina Maurel". It has been reviewed by Neil Young of Screen Daily, who wrote of "the tough, sensual, spiky feature-length debut by Costa Rican writer-director Valentina Maurel".

Accolades

References

External links
 
 

2022 films
2022 drama films
2020s Spanish-language films
2020s French films